Elaphidion auricoma is a species of beetle in the family Cerambycidae. It was described by Steve Lingafelter in 2008.

References

auricoma
Beetles described in 2008